The 1936–37 Challenge Cup was the 37th tournament of rugby league's oldest trophy, the Challenge Cup.  32 clubs entered the competition which was won by Widnes who beat Keighley 18–5 in the final at Wembley Stadium on 8 May 1937.  This was Widnes' second win in the competition and, to date, Keighley's only appearance in the final.

First round
The first round draw was made on 13 January 1937. 16 ties were drawn that were played on 13 February 1937.

First round replay
The replay between Castleford and Batley was played on the Wednesday 17 February 1937.

Second round
The draw for the second round was made on 15 February 1937 with the eight ties schedules 27 February. Only six ties were played that day as heavy snow forced the postponement of the game at Bradford and the match between Widnes and Dewsbury was abandoned at half-time with the score 8–0 to Widnes.

Second round replays
The replay between Castleford and Wigan was played on the Wednesday 3 March 1937 and the rescheduled Widnes v Dewsbury game was played on Thursday 4 March.

Third round
The third round draw was made on 1 March, ties were due to be played on 13 March, but the weather played a part again and the match between Huddersfield and Wigan was postponed an played on 17 March.

Semi-finals
The draw for the semi-finals was delayed until the third round tie between Huddersfield and Wigan had been played and was made on 18 March.  The semi-finals were played at neutral venues on Saturday 3 April.

Semi-final replay
Wakefield and Keighley met to replay their tie at Fartown Huddersfield on 7 April.

Final

Widnes and Keighley met in the final at Wembley Stadium on 8 May 1937. Widnes went 5–0 up within the first ten minutes as Tommy Shannon scored a try which Peter Topping converted. Just before the half-hour mark, Widnes scored another try as Tommy McCue over to give Widnes an 8–0 lead which remained the score at half-time. Immediately after the second half kicked off, Keighley were awarded a penalty which Joseph Sherburn kicked to reduce Widnes' lead to six points. Some Keighley pressure came to nothing and Ken Barber intercepted a pass to score Widnes' third try which Topping converted. Five minutes later Widnes' put the game beyond Keighley's reach as captain Nat Silcock scored their fourth try. Topping missed the conversion but made amends by kicking a penalty after an hours play. With the score 18–2 with minutes left to play, Keighley scored their only try as Reg Lloyd went over making the final score 18–5 to Widnes. The attendance or the game was 47,699 and the gate receipts totalled £6,579.

References

1937 in English rugby league
Challenge Cup